John Was Trying to Contact Aliens is a 2020 documentary film directed by Matthew Killip and starring John Shepherd. It tells the story of John Shepherd, who tried to contact aliens by broadcasting music into space for over 30 years with his state-of-the-art broadcasting equipment.

Cast 
 John Shepherd, as himself.

Release
John Was Trying to Contact Aliens was premiered at the 2020 Sundance Film Festival. It was released on August 20, 2020, on Netflix.

References

External links
 
 

2020 films
2020 documentary films
Netflix original documentary films
2020s English-language films